R.A.W is the second studio album by rapper Daz Dillinger. It was released on August 29, 2000 through D.P.G. Recordz, making it his first album to be released under the label.

Background
It was originally meant to be a Death Row Records release, but Daz took away the reels from Suge Knight, who was in jail at the time. After his return from prison, he got the reels back and put some of the songs from the album on Tha Dogg Pound compilation 2002, as well as "Baccstabbers" being on Mark Morrison's second studio album Innocent Man, a then-unreleased album by Death Row Records.

Track listing
Super Cuz (Intro) 0:21  
Street Gangs 1:58   
What Cha Talkin' Bout 4:17  
This Iz Not Over "Till We Say So" 3:39  
One-Nine-99   (feat. Lil' C-Style) 3:47
Who's Knocc'n At My Door   (feat. Big Pimpin' Delemond) 4:23
When Ya Lease Expected 4:13  
What It Iz 5:07  
I'd Rather Lie 2 Ya  (feat. Kurupt, Tray Deee) 3:57
On Tha Grind  (feat. Kurupt) 3:39
If You Want This Pussy (Interlude) 0:41
Your Gyrlfriend 2  (feat. Soopafly, Mac Shawn) 4:00
R.A.W.  (feat. Kurupt) 4:12
It'z All About That Money 4:01 
Movin' Around   (feat. Slip Capone) 4:02
U Ain't Know'n   (feat. Tray Deee) 4:00
Agony  (feat. LaToiya Williams) 3:58
Feels Good   (feat. Kurupt, LaToiya Williams) 5:03
My System  (feat. Kurupt, Tha Mactress) 4:02
Baccstabbers  (feat. Mark Morrison, Tray Deee) 4:22
Super Cuz (Outro) 0:29

Chart positions

References

2000 albums
Daz Dillinger albums
D.P.G. Recordz albums
Albums produced by Daz Dillinger
Albums produced by Soopafly